Thomas Musyl (born 13 January 1967) is an Austrian rower. He competed in the men's double sculls event at the 1988 Summer Olympics.

References

1967 births
Living people
Austrian male rowers
Olympic rowers of Austria
Rowers at the 1988 Summer Olympics
Sportspeople from Neuilly-sur-Seine